Girls to Chat & Boys to Bounce is the tenth studio album by British rock band Foghat, released in 1981. It is the first with new guitarist Erik Cartwright. The album peaked at No. 92 on the Billboard 200, making it a slight improvement over the group's previous record, Tight Shoes. In addition, the album's single "Live Now, Pay Later" bubbled under the Billboard Hot 100 at No. 102 and also hit No. 15 on the Mainstream Rock chart.

Track listing 
All tracks by Dave Peverett except where noted.
 "Wide Boy" – 2:44
 "Let Me Get Close to You" (Nick Jameson) – 5:36
 "Live Now – Pay Later" – 6:08
 "Love Zone" – 5:19
 "Delayed Reaction" – 6:14
 "Second Childhood" – 5:15
 "Weekend Driver" – 4:13
 "Sing About Love" (Live) (Jameson) – 3:36

Personnel 
 "Lonesome" Dave Peverett – lead and backing vocals, rhythm guitar
 Erik Cartwright – lead guitar, backing vocals
 Craig MacGregor – bass
 Roger Earl – drums, percussion
 Nick Jameson – keyboards, backing vocals

Charts

References 

Foghat albums
1981 albums
Bearsville Records albums
Rhino Records albums